The Leelanau Trail is part of U.S. Bicycle Route 35, but also an all paved non-motorized recreational rail trail of  in length that extends from the west side of Traverse City, Michigan to Suttons Bay, Michigan.

This trail passes through the eastern side of Leelanau County, a fast-growing section of the Traverse City metropolitan area.  Most, but not all, of the trail follows early 20th-century roadbeds of the former Manistee and North-Eastern Railroad and Traverse City, Leelanau and Manistique, later reorganized as the Leelanau Transit Company.

The Leelanau Trails Association purchased most of the  trail right-of-way in 1995.  Prior to this purchase, the railbed had been operated as Leelanau Scenic Railway.  In 2004, the Leelanau Trail was connected to the TART Trail at the junction of M-22 and M-72 on the northwest edge of Traverse City. The trail will be part of the Grand Traverse Edible Trails project. The idea of an edible forest is while on the trail you can pick of fruit from vines and or orchards, however with this project will take time to become a full-fledged forest.

The Leelanau Trail passes through a key segment of the Leelanau Peninsula AVA, part of the Michigan wine country. Riesling grapes are grown here.

Points of interest along the trail include:

Beaches
Downtown Suttons Bay
Wineries
Regional Transportation (Bay.Area.Transportation.Authority)
Bike shop (Suttons Bay)
DeYoung Nature Area on Cedar Lake

Trail heads

References

Protected areas of Leelanau County, Michigan
Rail trails in Michigan
Traverse City, Michigan